Icefish may mean:

 Channichthyidae, the crocodile icefish or white-blooded fish of the Antarctic region, so-named for their cold habitat and clear (colorless) blood without hemoglobin
 Jonah's icefish (Neopagetopsis ionah), of the Southern Ocean
 Nototheniidae, the cod icefish or notothens of the Antarctic region, whose members have red, hemoglobin-rich blood
 Salangidae, the icefish or noodlefish, a family of small, transparent or semi-transparent ("ice-like") fishes found in fresh, brackish and marine waters in East Asia and the northwestern Pacific Ocean
 , a submarine
 IceFish (band), a progressive rock project band started by Virgil Donati and Marco Sfogli

See also 
 Ice fishing